Silicalite is an inorganic compound with the formula SiO2.  It is one of several forms (polymorphs) of silicon dioxide.  It is a white solid. It consists of tetrahedral silicon centers and two-coordinate oxides.  It is prepared by hydrothermal reaction using tetrapropylammonium hydroxide followed by calcining to remove residual ammonium salts.  The compound is notable in being ca. 33% porous.  It is useful because the material contains (SiO)10 rings that allow sorption of hydrophobic molecules of diameter 0.6 nm.

A commercially important modification of silicalite is titanium silicalite.  With the formula Si1−xTixO2, it consists of silicalite with Ti doped into some Si sites.  Unlike conventional polymorphs of titanium dioxide, the Ti centers in titanium silicalite have tetrahedral coordination geometry.  The material is a useful catalyst for the reaction of hydrogen peroxide with propylene to give propylene oxide.

References

Polymorphism (materials science)